Railway line 1 is a double-track, electrified railway line running across the Masovian, Łódź and Silesian Voivodeship, and as such serving as the main railway artery between Warsaw and Katowice.

The line initially opened as part of the Warsaw–Vienna railway.

Route plan

References

 
Railway lines in Poland